Left Struggle (also "Fighting Left") was a Greek far left political coalition.

It was formed in 1993 by the following parties:
 New Left Current,
 Revolutionary Communist Movement of Greece (EKKE),
 Communist Party of Greece (Marxist-Leninist)
 Workers Revolutionary Party (EEK).

It received 8,160 votes in 1993 and 10,443 votes in the 1996 general elections.

The coalition didn't participate in the 1994 Euroelections due to CPG (m-l) disagreements. The remainder parties formed the Left Movement against the EU.

After 1997, the coalition disestablished and in 1999 all the parties of the coalition, except the CPG (m-l), formed Radical Left Front.

Defunct political party alliances in Greece
Defunct communist parties in Greece
Defunct socialist parties in Greece
1993 establishments in Greece
Political parties established in 1993
1997 disestablishments in Greece
Political parties disestablished in 1997
1990s in Greek politics

el:Μαχόμενη Αριστερά